The Kate Turner House is a historic house at 709 West Main Street in Magnolia, Arkansas.

History
It has the irregular massing and turret typical of Queen Anne styling, but its porch is more Colonial Revival in style. It was built by J. W. Turner as a residence for himself and his wife, Kate (Kelso) Turner, who was from a family with a long history in the county.

See also
National Register of Historic Places listings in Columbia County, Arkansas

References

Houses on the National Register of Historic Places in Arkansas
Queen Anne architecture in Arkansas
Colonial Revival architecture in Arkansas
Houses completed in 1904
Houses in Columbia County, Arkansas
National Register of Historic Places in Columbia County, Arkansas
1904 establishments in Arkansas
Magnolia, Arkansas